J. C. McDonald was an American racecar driver from South Bend, Indiana. The 1930 Indianapolis 500 was his only AAA Championship Car start. He drove a Studebaker "special" that he designed and built.

Indy 500 results

References

Indianapolis 500 drivers
Sportspeople from South Bend, Indiana
Racing drivers from Indiana
Year of birth missing
Year of death missing